Notre-Dame-des-Prairies is a town in the Lanaudière region of Quebec, Canada, part of the Joliette Regional County Municipality. It is a suburb of Joliette, located along the eastern shores of the L'Assomption River.

History
In 1950, the Parish of Notre-Dame-des-Prairies was established. The name refers to the prairies or planes of the Saint-Lawrence Lowlands that characterize the landscape. In 1957, the municipality was formed by separating from the Parish Municipality of Saint-Charles-Borromée-du-Village-d'Industrie. In 2005, the municipality changed statutes and became the City of Notre-Dame-des-Prairies.

Demographics 

Population trend:
 Population in 2016: 9273 (2011 to 2016 population change: 4.6%)
 Population in 2011: 8868 (2006 to 2011 population change: 7.8%)
 Population in 2006: 8230
 Population in 2001: 7316
 Population in 1996: 6837
 Population in 1991: 6465

Mother tongue:
 English as first language: 0.6%
 French as first language: 97.6%
 English and French as first language: 0%
 Other as first language: 1.8%

Education

Commission scolaire des Samares operates francophone public schools, including:
 École des Prairies
 pavillon Dominique-Savio
 pavillon Monseigneur-Jetté

The Sir Wilfrid Laurier School Board operates anglophone public schools, including:
 Joliette Elementary School in Saint-Charles-Borromée
 Joliette High School in Joliette

See also
List of cities in Quebec

References

Incorporated places in Lanaudière
Cities and towns in Quebec